Central/Inland Pomio Rural LLG is a local-level government (LLG) of East New Britain Province, Papua New Guinea.

Wards
01. Parole
02. Malakur
03. Kerkernena
04. Baien (West)
05. Galue
06. Marmar
07. Pomio
08. Olaipun
09. Sali
10. Bovalpun
11. Kalakru
12. Kawa
13. Tokai
14. Matong
15. Buka
16. Pulpul
17. Pakia
18. Mile
19. Mukulu
20. Malvoni
21. Muela
22. Bago
23. Pakaraman
24. Birigi
25. Bagitave
26. Kapkena
27. Tuki
28. Lakiri
29. Marmu
30. Masuari
31. Manigugule
32. Kavale
33. Gelioi

References

Local-level governments of East New Britain Province